James Higson (born 1876) was an English footballer. His regular position was as a forward. He was born in Manchester. He played for Manchester Wednesday and Manchester United.

External links
MUFCInfo.com profile

1876 births
English footballers
Manchester United F.C. players
Year of death missing
Association football forwards